Cape Nelson may refer to: 

Cape Nelson (Papua New Guinea), in Oro Province
the cape of that name in Cape Nelson State Park, Victoria, Australia